Michael Twomey may refer to:

Michael Twomey (actor) (1933–2017), Irish actor
Michael Twomey (judge), Irish High Court judge
Michael Twomey (politician), Irish politician who was a member of Seanad Éireann in 1938
Michael W. Twomey, American medievalist
Mick Twomey, Australian rules footballer